Eduardo Pereira (born 2 January 1972) is a retire footballer of Timor-Leste. He before played for FC Rusa Fuik and Timor-Leste national football team. He is a defender. Currently he was head coach of AS Ponta Leste in Liga Futebol Amadora.

References

External links

1972 births
Living people
Association football defenders
East Timorese footballers
Timor-Leste international footballers